Guasuctenus is a small genus of South American wandering spiders first described by D. Polotow and Antônio Domingos Brescovit in 2019.  it contains only two species: G. longipes and G. vittatissimus. The type species was originally described under the name "Ctenus griseus.

See also
 Ctenus
 List of Ctenidae species

References

Further reading

Ctenidae genera
Taxa named by Antônio Brescovit
Spiders of South America